Won Ok-im (born 6 November 1986) is a North Korean judoka.

She won a bronze medal in the half-middleweight category (63 kg) at the 2006 Asian Games, having defeated Battugs Tumenod of Mongolia in the bronze medal match.
She also won a bronze medal at 2008 Beijing.

She currently resides in Pyongyang.

References

External links
 
 

1986 births
Living people
North Korean female judoka
Olympic judoka of North Korea
Judoka at the 2008 Summer Olympics
Olympic bronze medalists for North Korea
Olympic medalists in judo
Asian Games medalists in judo
Medalists at the 2008 Summer Olympics
Judoka at the 2006 Asian Games
Asian Games bronze medalists for North Korea
Medalists at the 2006 Asian Games
21st-century North Korean women